Radical 40 or radical roof meaning "roof" is one of the 31 Kangxi radicals (214 radicals total) composed of three strokes.

In the Kangxi Dictionary, there are 246 characters (out of 49,030) to be found under this radical.

 is also the 48th indexing component in the Table of Indexing Chinese Character Components predominantly adopted by Simplified Chinese dictionaries published in mainland China.

Evolution

Derived characters

Literature

External links

Unihan Database - U+5B80

040
048